Richard Crighton Spence (born 1957) is a British film director and writer. He was born in 1957 in Doncaster, West Riding of Yorkshire, England. He received an M.A. in Classics from Oxford University.

Filmography

Career awards

References

External links

Living people
1957 births
British film directors
People from Doncaster